Eucalyptus pileata, commonly known as the capped mallee, is a species of mallee that is native to South Australia and Western Australia. It has smooth greyish bark, narrow lance-shaped adult leaves, flower buds in groups of seven, white flowers and cup-shaped, conical or barrel-shaped fruit.

Description
It has smooth, greyish bark that is shed in long ribbons to reveal orange or yellow new bark. Flowering occurs from February to May or from September to October and the flowers are white.

Taxonomy and naming
Eucalyptus pileata was first formally described in 1934 by William Blakely in his book A Key to Eucalypts from material collected near Ravensthorpe in 1909. The specific epithet (pileata) is from the Latin pileatus meaning "wearing a pileus", a kind of felt cap, referring to the cap-shaped operculum.

Distribution and habitat
Capped mallee grows in Western Australia and South Australia. It grows in shrubland between Balladonia, Kondinin, Norseman, Nugadong and Ravensthorpe in Western Australia. In South Australia it occurs on the Eyre Peninsula, mainly between the Hincks Conservation Park and Cummins.

Conservation status
This eucalypt is classified as "not threatened" in Western Australia by the Western Australian Government Department of Parks and Wildlife.

See also
List of Eucalyptus species

References

Eucalypts of Western Australia
pileata
Myrtales of Australia
Plants described in 1934
Taxa named by William Blakely